Wigwam is a Finnish progressive rock band formed in 1968.

History 
Wigwam  was founded after the split of the seminal Blues Section, with whom drummer Ronnie Österberg had played before. He formed the band as a trio, but soon brought in British expatriate singer/songwriter Jim Pembroke (also in Blues Section) and organist Jukka Gustavson. A year later, Pekka Pohjola joined on bass. Kim Fowley produced Wigwam's second album Tombstone Valentine (1970). This album also featured an excerpt of Erkki Kurenniemi's electronic composition 'Dance of the Anthropoids'. The 1974 album Being is often called Wigwam's masterpiece. After its release, though, Pohjola and Gustavson quit the band. Commercially the most successful Wigwam album must be the more pop-oriented Nuclear Nightclub that followed in 1975, with new members Pekka Rechardt on guitar and Måns Groundstroem on bass. The album was recorded in Stockholm with better studios, and featured Esa Kotilainen, the Finnish equivalent of Rick Wakeman, on synthesizer. The effect of the synthesizer was to steer the group away from the organ and piano sound of Gustavson that dominated previous albums. The band from Nuclear Nightclub on had songwriters Pembroke and Rechardt often working together, and the two came to describe the style as "deep pop" instead of progressive rock.

For a time in the 1970s Wigwam seemed poised to break through in Europe, along with bands like Tasavallan Presidentti, but even though they were highly praised by the UK press large-scale international fame eluded them, and by 1978 they had disbanded. Jim Pembroke and Ronnie Österberg formed the Jim Pembroke Band in late 1979, but following health problems with diabetes, Österberg committed suicide on 6 December 1980.

Wigwam reformed in the 1990s with the Pembroke-Rechardt-Groundstroem core intact, and has been active to the present. In Finland they have a lasting (although limited) following, and their influence on Finnish rock music is widely recognised.

In the 2010s, the former members of Wigwam have made concerts billed as Wigwam Unplugged or Wigwam Revisited. The latest line-up consists Mikko Rintanen, Jan Noponen, Måns Groundstroem and Jukka Gustavson with Pekka Nylund playing guitar.

In late 2018, the band made a short 50th anniversary tour in Finland with line-up of Jukka Gustavson, Jim Pembroke, Pekka Rechardt, Esa Kotilainen and Jan Noponen with Pave Maijanen on bass.

Band leader Jim Pembroke died in October 2021, aged 75.

Band members

Latest lineup 
 Jim Pembroke – vocals, keyboards (1969–2018; died 2021)
 Jukka Gustavson – vocals, electric organ (1969–1974, 2018)
 Pekka "Rekku" Rechardt – guitar (1974-)
 Jan Noponen – drums (1991–1993, 2018)
 Esa Kotilainen – keyboards (1974–75, 1977, 2001-)
 Pave Maijanen – bass guitar, vocals (2018; died 2021)

Drums 
 Ronald "Ronnie" Österberg (1968–1980; died 1980)
 Jari "Kepa" Kettunen (1993–2006)

Guitar 
 Vladimir "Nikke" Nikamo (1968–1970)

Bass guitar 
 Mats Huldén (1968–70, 2004–2006)
 Pekka Pohjola (1970–1974; died 2008)
 Måns "Måsse" Groundstroem (1974–2003)
 Jussi Kinnunen (2003–2004)

Violin 
 Pekka Pohjola (1970–1974; died 2008)

Keyboards 
 Heikki "Pedro" (or "Hessu") Hietanen (1975–1977, 1991–1992, 1999–2000)
 Mikko Rintanen (1992–1993)

Guest musicians 
 Jukka Tolonen, guitar (1970–1972), bass (2018)
 Esa Kotilainen, keyboards (1974–1975, 1977)
 Kristian (Bengt Huhta), vocals (1968)
 Ilpo Aaltio, saxophone (1968)
 Ilmari Varila, oboe
 Tapio Louhensalo, bassoon
 Hannu Saxelin, clarinet
 Risto Pensola, clarinet
 Unto Haapa-aho, bass clarinet
 Eero Koivistoinen, soprano saxophone
 Pekka Pöyry, soprano saxophone
 Pentti Lasanen, clarinet, flute
 Paavo Honkanen, clarinet
 Aale Lindgren, oboe
 Juhani Tapaninen, bassoon
 Juhani Aaltonen, flute
 Seppo Paakkunainen, flute
 Erik Dannholm, flute
 Pentti Lahti, flute
 Kari Veisterä, flute
 Taisto Wesslin, acoustic guitar
 Erkki Kurenniemi, VCS3 synthesizer
 Jukka Ruohomäki, VCS3 programming assistant
 Heikki Laurila, guitar, banjo
 Kalevi Nyqvist, accordion
 Pedro Hietanen, keyboards (2018)
 Mikko Rintanen, keyboards, vocals (2018)
 Kepa Kettunen, drums (2018)

Discography

Albums 
 Hard 'n' Horny (1969)
 Tombstone Valentine (1970)
 Fairyport (1971)
 Being (1974)
 Nuclear Nightclub (1975)
 The Lucky Golden Stripes and Starpose (1976)
 Dark Album (1977)
 Light Ages (1993)
 Titans Wheel  (2002)
 Some Several Moons (2005)

Compilations and live albums 
 Wigwam (1972)
 Live Music from the Twilight Zone (1975)
 Rumours on the Rebound (1979)
 Classics — The Rarest (1990)
 Highlights (1996)

Jim Pembroke (& Wigwam) 
These are Jim Pembroke's solo albums, which are played by Wigwam
 Hot Thumbs O'Riley: Wicked Ivory (1972)
 Jim Pembroke & Wigwam: Pigworm (1974)
 Jim Pembroke: Corporal Cauliflowers Mental Function (1977)

References

External links 
Wigwam – Nuclear Netclub
 
 

1968 establishments in Finland
Finnish progressive rock groups
Finnish rock music groups
Musical groups established in 1968